Yaxkukul Municipality (in the Yucatec Maya language: "where he first worships God") is one of the 106 municipalities in the Mexican state of Yucatán, containing  of land and located roughly  northeast of the city of Mérida. Survey maps of Yaxkukul cite its full name as "Santa Cruz de Mayo Yaxkukul".

History
It is unknown which chieftainship the area was under prior to the arrival of the Spanish. An ancient tradition is that a prince from Zaci (now Valladolid) sent a scouting party, which founded a town at the site. After the conquest, the area became part of the encomienda system. In 1607 the encomienda of Nabalam was joined with Yaxkukul, still later Yaxkukul was joined with Tahcab, and in 1667 was granted to the encomendero Francisco Menéndez Morán.

Yucatán declared its independence from the Spanish Crown in 1821 and in 1825, the area was assigned to the coastal region with its headquarters in Izamal Municipality. Still later, it passed to the Tixkokob Municipality and in 1918, was designated as its own municipality.

Yucatán architecture evolved in towns like Yaxkukul, Tixpehual, and Euan on the "preconquest platform foundation" and in the sixteenth century the features of churches consisted of an open view of chapel, the elongated nave and facade of espadana which finally "complemented these buildings in the eighteenth century".

Governance
The municipal president is elected for a three-year term. The town council has seven councilpersons, who serve as secretary and councilors of public works, ecology, public monuments, and nomenclature.

Communities
The head of the municipality is Yaxkukul, Yucatán.  The other populated areas of the municipality include Hacienda Chac-Abal, San Francisco, San Juan de las Flores, Santa Cruz Canto and Yaxcopoil. The significant populations are shown below:

Local festivals
Every year from 16 January to 10 February the town holds a celebration for the Virgin of Candelaria.

Tourist attractions
 Church of Candelaria, built in the eighteenth century
 Hacienda Chac-Abal
 Hacienda San Juan de las Flores

Bibliography

References

Municipalities of Yucatán